The 1st Pennsylvania House of Representatives District is in northwestern Pennsylvania and has been represented by Pat Harkins since 2006.

District profile 
The 1st Pennsylvania House of Representatives District is located in Erie County, Pennsylvania and includes the following area:
 Erie (part)
 Ward 01 
 Ward 02
 Ward 03
 Ward 04
 Ward 06 
 Lawrence Park Township
 Township of Lake Erie

Representatives

Recent election results

References

External links 
 District map from the United States Census Bureau
 Pennsylvania House Legislative District Maps from the Pennsylvania Redistricting Commission.
 Population Data for District 1 from the Pennsylvania Redistricting Commission.

Government of Erie County, Pennsylvania
Erie, Pennsylvania
1